Dirhinosia arnoldiella is a moth of the family Gelechiidae. It is found in Israel, Turkey and Greece.

The wingspan is 11–13 mm. The forewings are dull shiny yellowish ochreous. The hindwings are light greyish brown to brown. Adults have been recorded on wing from May to July.

References

Moths described in 1905
Dirhinosia
Moths of Europe
Moths of Asia